The C219 Mercedes-Benz CLS-Class is the first generation of the CLS-Class range of four-door coupe features a fastback body style by Mercedes-Benz, and was produced between 2004 and 2010.
 
The CLS-Class has only four seats and is marketed by Mercedes as a four-door coupé. It was the first model globally to introduce this four-door coupe style and VW followed with the Volkswagen CC model in 2008 and the Porsche Panamera and Audi A7 in 2009.

The car is less practical than the W211 E-Class that it is based on, with less legroom, headroom, and boot space. The CLS-Class is priced above the E-Class, but below the S-Class in the Mercedes model range.
It was replaced by the Mercedes-Benz CLS-Class (C218) in 2011.

Development and launch 
The C219 CLS-Class is based on the Vision CLS concept that was unveiled at the 2003 Frankfurt International Motor Show. The design combined the roof-line of a coupé onto the body of a four-door chassis leading to a fastback vehicle.

The car is  longer,  wider, and  lower in comparison, and features, according to Mercedes, a 30% stiffer suspension setup and faster steering.

Design patents were filed on July 24, 2002. The production version CLS500 debuted at the 2004 New York International Auto Show.

Equipment 
Standard equipment includes heated automatically dimming mirrors, rain-sensing wipers, and an automatic climate control system. The CLS-Class comes with front and side airbags, and a smart sensor system connected to the seatbelts and airbags that can detect and react to an accident.

Models

Petrol engines

Diesel engines

Special models

CLS 55 AMG 
Compared to the standard model, the CLS 55 AMG has larger 360 mm brake discs with eight-piston callipers from the SL55 AMG, wider 18-inch alloy wheels, revised stiffer AirMATIC air suspension with multiple driving modes, AMG bodywork, and a five-speed automatic transmission.

CLS 63 AMG 

The CLS 63 AMG was introduced in 2006, as the successor to the CLS 55 AMG. The new transmission includes a comfort, sport, and manual mode that allows for the manual changing of gears. Sport mode have shift speeds that are almost 30% faster than comfort and 50% faster than manual. The car also features an updated instrument cluster and alloy-wheel design. 

The CLS 63 AMG was able to reach  in 4.5 seconds.

CLS Grand Edition (2009) 
The CLS Grand Edition was a special edition model of the CLS-Class, with only 560 units produced and sold in 2009. Standard equipment included: bi-xenon headlights, titanium grey 18-inch five-spoke alloy wheels, laurel wood interior trim, and 'Grand Edition' insignia. Models were also offered with a choice of designo leather upholstery and four exclusive metallic exterior paint colours.

Model year changes

2006 
 CLS 350 replaced by CLS 350 CGI
 CLS 55 AMG replaced by CLS 63 AMG
 CLS 500 upgraded to 5.5-litre engine
 SBC was discontinued.

2008 facelift 
In 2008, a facelift was introduced for the CLS-Class:

 Exterior changes include: restyled bumpers and mirrors, LED taillights, redesigned grille now with two louvres, new alloy-wheel designs, squarer shaped tailpipes
 Interior changes include: introduction of new COMAND APS NTG 2.5 system, non-COMAND systems now have 5.0-inch colour screen, new restyled three-spoke steering wheel
 CLS63 AMG model now comes with: black grille, 19-inch alloy wheels, AMG sports exhaust system, and new AMG steering wheel
 Introduction of CLS280 model

Pre-facelift styling

Post-facelift styling

2009 
 Limited production Grand Edition models introduced.

Sales figures 
The CLS-Class was produced in Sindelfingen, Germany.

The following are the sales figures in European markets and in the United States only:

References

Notes

Bibliography

External links 

CLS-Class
Rear-wheel-drive vehicles
Luxury vehicles
2010s cars
Cars introduced in 2004
Sports sedans
Coupés